Allotinus drumila, the crenulate darkie, is a small butterfly found in India (Assam, Sikkim), Burma, Thailand, Laos, Vietnam, and Yunnan (China) that belongs to the lycaenids or blues family.

Description
Male upperside: earthy brown. Forewing: costa at base and a broad outward discal streak from beyond apex of cell curved downwards towards but not reaching the tornal angle, dull white, diffuse at the edges; apex and termen broadly very dark blackish-brown. Hindwing: costal margin above the subcostal vein and in a line with it up to the termen similarly very dark blackish-brown, the rest of the brown colour uniform without any white. Underside, forewing: dull pale brown, costal margin and disc mottled with small catenulated spots of dark brown; cell with three short transverse bars of dark brown, the middle bar extended below the cell but not reaching the dorsum; a white curved discal band as on the upperside, but obscure, diffuse and ill-defined, merged with a pale area along the middle of the dorsum; termen broadly margined with dark rusty brown that has more or less of a mottled appearance. Hindwing: dull pale brown thickly mottled with catenulated spots and strigeo of dark rusty brown; catenulated, somewhat broken, transverse irregular bands of the latter colour cross the base, middle and apex of the cell; a similar short band is placed at right angles to the dorsal margin and curving slightly upwards terminates at vein 3.  Antennae dark brown; head, thorax and abdomen rusty brown; beneath: the palpi, thorax and abdomen narrowly whitish.

Female upperside: white. Forewing: apical, terminal and tornal areas black, the inner margin of the black commences just before the middle of the costa, and runs obliquely outward in a sinuous curve to base of the apical fourth of vein 2, thence it is produced for a short distance inwardly along that vein and terminates at the middle of the dorsal margin. Hindwing: a broad black stripe along the costal margin; the termen somewhat narrowly pale yellowish-brown. Underside white, the markings somewhat variable. Forewing: costa, apex and termen with minute earthy-brown speckles, sparse along the costa, more dense on the termen; on the latter they coalesce and form a brown smudgy border that is bounded on the inner side by a curved, postdiscal, more or less clearly defined, narrow, yellowish-brown band; cell crossed transversely by a basal, a medial and an apical short similar band; the medial band darkened in colour and continued almost to the dorsum, the apical band along the discocellulars. Hindwing: with minute brown speckles, more or less lightly and irregularly stained with rusty brown; basal half with obscure, transverse, narrow, macular, earthy-brown bauds that are well-defined only anteriorly, the basal one produced up to the dorsum; a short dark-edged transverse band from the tornus to vein 4 running parallel to the costal margin, the lower edge of the band acutely and irregularly dentate; the terminal and tornal areas below this band washed with earthy brown. Antenna, head, thorax and abdomen as in the male but very much paler.

See also
List of butterflies of India (Lycaenidae)

Cited references

References
Print

Online

External links

Allotinus
Butterflies of Asia
Butterflies described in 1866